The Flinders Ranges are a mountain range in the state of South Australia.

Flinders Ranges may refer to one of these places in the state:

Flinders Ranges, South Australia, a locality
Flinders Ranges Council, a local government area
Flinders Ranges Way, a road 
Ikara–Flinders Ranges National Park, a protected area
Wapma Thura–Southern Flinders Ranges National Park, a protected area, proclaimed 2021

See also

Flinders (disambiguation)